The Singapore Sailing Federation (Abbreviation: SSF), also known as SingaporeSailing, is the National Sports Association (NSA) responsible for the management and organisation of the sport of sailing in Singapore.

The Federation works closely with Sport Singapore, on various fronts and adheres to the various rules and regulations required by Sport Singapore for NSAs. SingaporeSailing works with various clubs and affiliates in Singapore and also the Singapore National Olympic Council (SNOC) and World Sailing on the high performance front.

The Federation is currently headed by Lincoln Chee and it is headquartered at the National Sailing Centre in East Coast Park.

History
In 1966, the Singapore Yachting Association was founded by Jack Snowden who served as its first president.

In 1994, the National Optimist Sailing Scheme (NOSS) was setup to focus on training sailors on the Optimist class. A National Optimist Certification Scheme was introduced in 2000 to recognise young sailors who take up sailing.

On 29 April 2000, the Singapore Yachting Association was renamed as Singapore Sailing Federation, also known as SingaporeSailing.

Organisation 
In September 2010, Federation revealed a strategic blueprint called The Next Leg. It seeks to steer the development of sailing in the next decade via 10 Strategic Thrusts. These thrusts guide the Federation's efforts as it continues to forge ahead. Besides heightening focus on High Performance operations and programmes, in line with the recommendations put forth by the Olympic Pathway Taskforce in 2011, the Federation also set up a High Participation Committee in 2015 to coordinate efforts in sailing participation islandwide.

Executive committee and board members 

 President - Lincoln Chee
 Deputy President - Stanley Chan
 Vice President - Jevan Tan
 Vice President - Pamela Goh
 Vice President - Alan Goh
 Honorary Treasurer - James Tan
 Deputy Treasurer - Toh Liying

Presidents 

 Jack Snowden - 1965 to 1972
 Seah Peng Yong - 1972 to 1975
 C. Kuttan - 1975 to 1989
 Ng Ser Miang - 1989 to 1991
 Peter H. L. Lim - 1992 to 1993
 Ong Siong Kai - 1993 to 1998
 Low Teo Ping - 1998 to 2010
 Ben Tan - 2010 to 2018
 Lincoln Chee - 2018 to Present

Clubs and affiliates 
 Changi Sailing Club
 Constant Wind Sea Sports @ NSRCC Sea Sports Centre
 Kitesurfing Association of Singapore
 Marina at Keppel Bay
 One Degree 15 Marina Club
 Outward Bound Singapore
 Raffles Marina
 Republic of Singapore Yacht Club
 SAF Yacht Club
 Seletar Country Club
 Singapore Disability Sports Council
 Singapore Polytechnic Student Yacht Club
 SMU Sailing Club
 Water Venture PA (East Coast)
 Windsurfing Association of Singapore
 Aloha Sea Sports Centre

Events 
SingaporeSailing organises several events and regattas each year to maintain a vibrant sailing landscape and to engage the community. While there are many regattas each year, some are staple regattas that are held every year.

Singapore Youth Sailing Championship 
The Singapore Youth Sailing Championship is the largest youth regatta in the local sailing calendar. It is typically held in March, in conjunction with the week-long school holiday in Singapore. The regatta is held at the National Sailing Centre, which is an accredited World Sailing Approved Training Centre.

The Singapore Youth Sailing Championship is also an international regatta where sailors from overseas are allowed to participate in. The regatta typically witnesses around 350 sailors from 11 different countries competing over 3 or 4 days.

The title of the regatta  also varies depending on sponsorship as well as the theme of the event. In 2019, the regatta is called the Singapore Youth Team Racing Championship.

Singapore National Sailing Championship 
The Singapore National Sailing Championship is the largest regatta in the local sailing calendar, attracting more than 400 sailors from 15 countries. The regatta is typically held in June, coinciding with the month-long June school holidays and it is held over 5 days.

Similar to the Singapore Youth Sailing Championship, the Singapore National Sailing Championship is held at the National Sailing Centre.

Pesta Sukan 
"Pesta Sukan" is a Malay phrase for Festival of Sports.

Conceived by the then Ministry of Culture, Singapore's first festival of sports was held from 4 - 12 December 1964. An ad hoc organising committee, composed of well-known sports personalities and government officials, was formed while NSAs and other major sporting organisations also lent their support.

Today, each NSA holds their own Pesta Sukan. The SingaporeSailing holds it in August, leading up to the National Day celebrations.

NSC Cup Series 
The NSC Cup Series comprises three small regattas where sailors across different boat classes compete over three days of racing. Each regatta has a small awards ceremony, while the third and final regatta determines the overall winner of the NSC Cup Series for the year. Points are calculated and aggregated based on the performance of sailors across all three regattas.

Notable sailors
Griselda Khng (49erFX) - Olympian
Kimberly Lim (49erFX) - Olympian, Optimist World Championships Champion
Ryan Lo (Laser Standard) - Olympian
Cecilia Low (49erFX) - Olympian

Elisa Yukie Yokoyama (470), Optimist World Championship Champion
Justin Liu (Nacra 17) - Olympian
Denise Lim (Nacra 17) - Olympian
Audrey Yong (Techno 293) - Olympian
Jovina Choo Bei Fen (470) - Olympian

Asian Games Gold Medalists

References

National members of World Sailing
Sailing in Singapore
Sailing
Yachting associations
Sailing governing bodies
1954 establishments in Singapore
Sports organizations established in 1954